Viddler is an online sales training platform with integrated tools for practice and evaluation. The Viddler service offers video-based instruction and optional coaching and allows customers to engage with course content through guided assignments and self-recorded practice sessions.

History

The company, headquartered in Bethlehem, Pennsylvania, was founded in November 2005, by Robert Sandie, Greg Gurevich, Joshua Mann, and Donna DeMarco.

Viddler no longer provides a free service for non-commercial users. In 2010, Viddler began focusing less on video enthusiasts and self-generated content hosting, and more on business verticals, including corporate communication and training, education, and publishing. Following a 2011 decision to discontinue new personal accounts, Viddler announced in 2014 that it was going to close those legacy accounts, giving users the option of opening a paid account or downloading their existing videos.

References

Video hosting
2005 establishments in Pennsylvania
Online companies of the United States
Former video hosting services